Paul Mullie is a screenwriter and producer. He is credited for writing episodes of Stargate Atlantis, Largo Winch, and Stargate SG-1. He has also worked as executive producer on Stargate: Atlantis and is the co-creator of Dark Matter with Joseph Mallozzi.

Writing credits
Stargate SG-1
Season 4
Window of Opportunity
Scorched Earth
Point of No Return
The Curse
Chain Reaction
Prodigy (with Joseph Mallozzi, Brad Wright)
Exodus
Season 5
Enemies (with Joseph Mallozzi, Brad Wright, Robert C. Cooper)
The Fifth Man
The Tomb
Desperate Measures
Wormhole X-Treme! (with Joseph Mallozzi, Brad Wright)
Summit
Fail Safe
Revelations
Season 6
Descent
Night Walkers
Shadow Play
Prometheus
Disclosure
Prophecy
Season 7
Homecoming
Revisions
Avenger 2.0
Fallout (with Joseph Mallozzi, Corin Nemec
Inauguration
Season 8
New Order 1 (Part 1 Only)
Lockdown
Endgame
It's Good to be King (with Joseph Mallozzi, Michael Greenburg & Peter DeLuise
Full Alert
Moebius 1&2 (with Joseph Mallozzi, Brad Wright, Robert C. Cooper)
Season 9
The Ties That Bind
Ex Deus Machina
Collateral Damage
Ripple Effect (with Joseph Mallozzi, Brad Wright)
The Scouge
Camelot
Season 10
Morpheus
200 (with Joseph Mallozzi, Brad Wright, Robert C. Cooper, Martin Gero, Carl Binder & Alan McCullough)
Counterstrike
Memento Mori
The Quest 1&2
Family Ties

References

External links 
 

Canadian male screenwriters
American television producers
Living people
American television writers
American male television writers
Year of birth missing (living people)
21st-century Canadian screenwriters
21st-century Canadian male writers